Soon Valley (Punjabi) is in the north west of Khushab District, Punjab, Pakistan. Its largest settlement is the town of Naushera. The valley extends from the village of Padhrar to Sakesar, the highest peak in the Salt Range. It covers a   area. Soon Valley has an abundance of scenic beauty, with lakes, waterfalls, jungle, natural pools and ponds. The valley has been settled since ancient times, most recently by the Awan tribe, which still resides in the valley.

It was once the summer headquarters of the Deputy Commissioners of three districts – Campbellpur (now Attock), Mianwali and Shahpur (now Sargodha). It is the only mountain in this part of the Punjab which receives snowfall in winter. In the late 1950s the Pakistan Air Force placed a radar station on Sarkesar to monitor airspace over north-eastern Pakistan. Also on the mountain is a television transmission center with which the Pakistan Television Corporation relays its transmissions to the surrounding area.

Geography

Location
Distance from Islamabad: 230 km
Distance from Sargodha: 120 km
Distance from Lahore: 320 km
Distance from Karachi: 1262 km

History and Demography

In 997 CE, Sultan Mahmud Ghaznavi, took over the Ghaznavid dynasty empire established by his father, Sultan Sebuktegin. In 1005 he conquered the Shahis in Kabul and followed it by conquests within the Punjab region. The Delhi Sultanate and later Mughal Empire ruled the region. 

The Awans of the Soon Valley were also amongst those the British considered to be "martial race". The British recruited army heavily from Soon Valley for service in the colonial army, and as such, the Awans of this area also formed an important part of the British Indian Army, serving with distinction during World Wars I and II. Of all the Muslim groups recruited by the British, proportionally, the Awans produced the greatest number of recruits during the First and Second World Wars. Contemporary historians Professor Ian Talbot and Professor Tan Tai Yong have asserted that the Awans (amongst other tribes) are viewed as a martial race by not only the British, but neighbouring tribes as well. Awans occupy the highest ranks of the Pakistani Army. A village by the name of Manawan (formerly Man Awan – The heart of the Awans) is also among the notable historical villages of the valley.

Gateway to Soon Sakesar
The Government of Punjab constructed the road from Nurewala to Naushehra in recognition of services rendered by the Awans of Soon Valley during the First World War. Sir W.M. Hailey, the Governor of Punjab formally opened the road on April 1, 1928 – as commemorated on plaques between Khushab and Sakesar as the road enters the hills.

Culture
Many inhabitants of the valley descend from tribes of Arab origin (unauthenticated information). Islamic culture and traditions are the norm. Practices include arranged marriages according to the Islamic traditions, where the wedding ceremony takes place at a mosque. The Nikah is attended by close family members, relatives, and friends of the bride and groom. Usually men and women are separated, either sitting in separate rooms or with a purdah (curtain) separating them.

Luddi is a folk dance for celebratory occasions, when the music is often played on the dhol drum and shehnai oboe.

Lakes of Soon Valley

Uchhali Lake is a picturesque salt water lake in the southern Salt Range overlooked by mount Sakaser, the highest mountain in the Salt Range. Its brackish water means that its waters are lifeless. Khabikki Lake is also a salt water lake in the southern Salt Range. It is one kilometer wide and two kilometres long. Khabikki is also the name of a neighbouring village. These lakes attract thousands of migratory birds each year including rare white-headed ducks (Oxyura leucocephala) from Central Asia. Jahlar Lake is another serene lake in the valley, it is accessible from Nowshehra as well as from Sargodha.

Historical places
 Akrand Fort of Janjua's (Road way & Tracking Way from Kanhati Garden).
 Lakes: Uchhali Lake, Khabikki Lake and Jahlar Lake.
 Waterfalls at Kufri.
 Amb Sharif is a historical place in Hinduism.
 Kanahti Garden, Sodhi Garden, Khabakki Jheel, Ugalisharif & Uchali Jheel, Sakesar and Daip Shareef and the hiking experiences of hills
 Angah, an important village.
 Sodhi village has waterfalls, a Rest House, and wild animals like Cheetah, Rabbit, Deer, Teetar (Urdu name of a bird).
 Koradhi is famous for its Historical Madrissa, where Qari Qamar Din used to teach

Amb Shareef Hindu temple
The ancient pre-Islamic ancient Hindu temple, is near the Amb Shareef village, on the Sakesar mountain in the Soon Valley. The temple complex, built in brick and mortar, is complex of two temples facing each other. The main temple is several story high, roughly 15 to 20 meter tall. To the west about 75 meters lies another smaller temple, which is 2 story or 7 to 8 meters high. It is located on the Sakesar mountain, near Amb Shareef village.

See also

 Amb Temples
 Hinduism in Pakistan
 Rohtas Fort
 Rawat Fort
 Pharwala
 Sar Jalal
 Mankiala stupa
 Hinglaj Mata
 Kalat Kali Temple
 Malot
 Multan Sun Temple
 Prahladpuri Temple
 Nandana
 Sakesar
 Sadh Belo
 Shivaharkaray
 Shiv Mandir, Umerkot
 Shri Varun Dev Mandir
 Tilla Jogian
 Khabikki Lake
 Namal Lake
 Swaik Lake
 Uchhali Lake

References

External links
 http://visitsoonvalley.com/
 See you Soon Valley, The News International
 Sakesar temple picture travelogue

Archaeological sites in Punjab, Pakistan
Geography of Punjab, Pakistan
Hill stations in Pakistan
Khushab District
Punjab
Punjab, Pakistan
Regions of Punjab, Pakistan
Tourist attractions in Punjab, Pakistan
Valleys of Punjab (Pakistan)